Russell Adams Sears (June 21, 1869 – July 22, 1932) was the fifth mayor of Quincy, Massachusetts.

Notes

External links
Russell Adams Sears at Find A Grave

|

1869 births
1932 deaths
Massachusetts lawyers
Massachusetts Republicans
Mayors of Quincy, Massachusetts
American Unitarians